The line (abbreviated L or l or ‴ or lin.) was a small English unit of length, variously reckoned as , , , or  of an inch. It was not included among the units authorized as the British Imperial system in 1824.

Size

The US button trade uses the same or a similar term but defined as one-fortieth of the US-customary inch (making a button-maker's line equal to 0.635 mm).

In use
Botanists formerly used the units (usually as  inch) to measure the size of plant parts. Linnaeus's Philosophia botanica  (1751) includes the Linea in its summary of units of measurements, defining it as "Linea una Mensurae parisinae"; Stearns gives its length as 2.25 mm. Even after metrication, British botanists continued to employ tools with gradations marked as linea (lines); the British line is approx. 2.1 mm and the Paris line approx. 2.3 mm.

Entomologists, both in the UK and in other European countries, in the 1800s were using lines as a unit of measurement for insects, at least for the relatively large mantids and phasmids - examples include Westwood, in the UK, and de Haan in the Netherlands.

Gunsmiths and armament companies also employed the -inch line (the "decimal line"), in part owing to the importance of the German and Russian arms industries. These are now given in terms of millimeters, but the seemingly arbitrary 7.62 mm caliber was originally understood as a 3-line caliber (as with the 1891 Mosin–Nagant rifle). The 12.7 mm caliber used by the M2 Browning machine gun was similarly a 5-line caliber.

Foreign units
Other similar small units called lines include:

 The Russian  (ли́ния),  of the diuym which had been set precisely equal to an English inch by Peter the Great
 The French  or "Paris line",  of the French inch, 2.256 mm and about 1.06 L.
 The Portuguese ,  of the Portuguese inch or 12 "points" or 2.29 mm
 The German  was usually  of the German inch but sometimes also  German inch
 The Vienna line,  of a Vienna inch.

See also
 English units used prior to 1824
 Imperial units defined by the British Weights and Measures Act of 1824
 List of unusual units of measurement

References

Citations

Bibliography
 .
 .
 .
 .
 .

Units of length
Obsolete units of measurement